Aenetus scripta is a species of moth of the family Hepialidae. It is endemic to south-western Australia.

The wingspan is about 80 mm. The hindwings are blue in males and yellow in females.

External links
 Images
 Australian Caterpillars

Moths described in 1869
Hepialidae